This article contains information about the literary events and publications of 1718.

Events
November 1 – Lady Mary Wortley Montagu writes the last of her Turkish Letters, addressed to Alexander Pope.
November 18 – Voltaire's first play, Oedipus, premières at the Comédie-Française in Paris. This is his first use of the pseudonym. He has been released from the Bastille this year, while Marguerite De Launay, Baronne Staal, begins a two-year sentence.
The Freethinker (newspaper) is founded by Ambrose Philips and Hugh Boulter.
Laurence Eusden becomes Poet Laureate of England.
Ludvig Holberg becomes a professor at the University of Copenhagen.

New books

Prose
Nicholas Amhurst – Protestant Popery; or, The Convocation (part of the Bangorian Controversy)
Daniel Defoe (attr.) – A Vindication of the Press
Charles Gildon – The Complete Art of Poetry
Mary Hearne – The Lover's Week
Simon Ockley – The History of the Saracens, volume 2
Ambrose Philips – The Free-Thinker (periodical)
Allan Ramsay -Christ's Kirk on the Green (revised version)
John Ray – Philosophical Letters
John Strype – The Life and Acts of John Witgift
John Toland – Nazarenus, or Jewish, Gentile and Mahometan Christianity
John Wilmot, 2nd Earl of Rochester – Remains of the Earl of Rochester

Drama
Charles Beckingham – Scipio Africanus
John Durant Breval – The Play is the Plot
Christopher Bullock – The Traitor
Susanna Centlivre – A Bold Stroke for a Wife
Charles Molloy – The Coquet
Richard Savage – Love in a Veil
Elkanah Settle and Lewis Theobald – The Lady's Triumph
Voltaire – Œdipe

Poetry
Joseph Addison
Poems on Several Occasions
The Resurrection
Richardson Pack – Miscellanies in Verse and Prose
Alexander Pope – The Iliad of Homer iv

Births
February 18
Søren Abildgaard, Danish naturalist, author and artist (died 1791)
Robert Henry, Scottish historian (died 1790)
April 7 – Hugh Blair, Scottish rhetorician (died 1800)
May 16 – Maria Gaetana Agnesi, Italian philosopher (died 1799)
July 18 – Saverio Bettinelli, Italian Jesuit writer (died 1808)

Deaths
April 27 – Jacques Bernard, French theologian (born 1658)
May 16 – Jonas Danilssønn Ramus, Norwegian historian (born 1649)
May 22 – Gaspard Abeille, French lyric and tragic poet (born 1648)
July 28 – Étienne Baluze, French scholar (born 1630)
October 9 – Richard Cumberland, English philosopher and bishop (born 1631)
December 6 – Nicholas Rowe, English dramatist (born 1674)
December 9 – Vincenzo Coronelli Italian encyclopedist (born 1674)

See also

Bangorian Controversy
1718 in poetry

References

 
Years of the 18th century in literature